Breathing Fire is a 1991 American martial arts film directed by Lou Kennedy in his directorial debut, and co-directed by Brandon De-Wilde. The film stars Ke Huy Quan, with a supporting cast of Eddie Saavedra, Ed Neil and Jerry Trimble. The film was released on direct-to-VHS in the United States on July 15, 1992.

It is a remake of the 1977 Hong Kong film The Flash Legs that starred Tao-liang Tan, who executive produced and wrote this film under the pseudonym of Delon Tanners. This was Eddie Saavedra's first and only American film. After the film, Saavedra has retired from acting.

Plot
Michael Moore (Jerry Trimble), a Vietnam vet, pulls off a bank heist with his gang, which includes the bank's manager. To ensure the loyalty of everyone involved, a set of keys is made to the hiding place for the loot so it can only be opened if all the members are present. These sets of keys were encrusted in a fake pizza mold that was later sliced and given to the gang. The bank manager gets cold feet and tries to back out, but Michael and his henchman arrive to kill him and his wife in their home.

The bank manager's daughter Annie (Laura Hamilton) gets hold of the key and runs for help to David Moore (Ed Neil), one of her father's old friends and also a Vietnam vet as well as Michael's brother. David does some investigation, alongside Michael's two sons, Charlie (Ke Huy Quan) and Tony (Eddie Saavedra), to find out who murdered the girl's parents. During his investigation, a disguised Michael cripples David. Charlie and Tony, having seen David fight, are impressed with his skills and asks him to train them. At first, David refuses. However, when the brothers are able to prove their bravery when they kneel on bricks overnight. David begins training the brothers. When the brothers' investigation leads them to one of Michael's gang members, Tank (Wendell C. Whitaker), a confrontation leads to Tank having a change of heart for the sake of his mother. Tank decides to help the brothers gain intel but Michael eventually finds out and kills Tank. Meanwhile, Tony and Charlie use their new skills first on gang member Alan (Allen Tackett) and eventually, the hulking Thunder (Bolo Yeung).

When David and Charlie eventually learn Michael is the gang leader and the one who killed the bank manager, Michael confronts the two. However, trouble brews up when Michael reveals why he adopted his son Charlie. During their time in Vietnam, David caught Michael killing Charlie's birth mother and had convinced him to adopt the orphaned baby. Shocked, Charlie is at first upset but then attempts to reason with Michael. However, Michael's arrogance and ultimatum leads to a showdown between father and son. When Michael is arrested, Tony arrives and not knowing the truth, puts the blame on Charlie. Tony vows to settle the score with Charlie at the national taekwondo tournament. Both Charlie and Tony eventually make the finals and Charlie at first refuses to fight Tony. After getting berated by the referee, Charlie finally fights back until he lets Tony knock him out. Tony wins but is even more in regret when he sees an unconscious Charlie. Tony attempts to help wake Charlie up and when he does, the brothers finally make amends with Tony the winner of the tournament.

Cast
 Ke Huy Quan (credited as Jonathan Ke Quan) as Charlie Moore
 Eddie Saavedra as Tony Moore
 Ed Neil as David Moore
 Jerry Trimble as Michael Moore
 Bolo Yeung as Thunder
 Wendell C. Whitaker as Tank
 Alan Tackett as Alan
 Jacqueline Pulliam as Jenny
 Laura Hamilton as Annie Stern
 Drake Diamond as Peter Stern
 T. J. Storm as Mickey (as Juan Ojeda)
 Pamela Maxton as Tank's Mother
 Jacqueline Woolsey as Mrs. Stern
 Gary Green as Harry
 Annie Wood as April (as Annie Rubanoff)
 Eugene Trammell as Bank Security Guard

Production
Jason David Frank was considered for the role of Tony, Frank turned down the role due to an injury occurred to him while training. The future Power Rangers star was then replaced by Eddie Saavedra. It is set and filmed at Chino Hills, Redlands and Fontana, California, in 39 days between February 22 and April 2, 1990, with part of the movie filmed at the home of Executive Producer Peter L. Zang in Bradbury, California.

The idea of the film came from former kung fu star Tan Tao-liang, who used the pseudonym "Delon Tanners". Tan was running his martial arts school in Monterey Park, California at the time and was a mentor to actor Ke Huy Quan. Tan took the idea partly from his 1977 film Shaolin Deadly Kicks, which had a similar premise of a gang who steals a key and splits it in pieces. Tan also served as executive producer on the film.

References

External links

 
 
 

1991 films
1991 direct-to-video films
1991 directorial debut films
1991 martial arts films
1990s American films
1990s English-language films
American independent films
American martial arts films
Films set in California
Kickboxing films
Kung fu films
Martial arts tournament films